Peter Pett (6 August 1610 – 1672) was an English Master Shipwright and Second Resident Commissioner of Chatham Dockyard. He protected his scale models and drawings of the King's Fleet during the Dutch Raid on the Medway, in Kent in June 1667, during the Second Anglo-Dutch War, which was otherwise disastrous to the British Royal Navy.

Life
Pett was the son of the King's Master Shipwright Captain Phineas Pett. He was introduced to King Charles I of England in 1634 and was ordered to construct a new Third Rate ship of 500 tons at Woolwich Dockyard, to be named HMS Leopard. With the construction of the Leopard underway, Charles decided that he would have a ship built larger and more ornate than any of her predecessors.

In June 1634 while at Woolwich and on the Leopard with the king, Phineas Pett, Peter's father, related: "His Highness, calling me aside, privately acquainted me of his princely resolution for the building of a great new ship, which he would have me undertake...."

Peter Pett built HMS Sovereign of the Seas at Woolwich Dockyard, from the plans made by his father.

One of the largest in the world at that time, the Sovereign was a ship of 1,637 tons and was launched on 12 October 1637, after about two years in construction.

John Evelyn wrote in his Diary on 19 July 1641 "We rode to Rochester and Chatham to see the Soveraigne, a monstrous vessel so called, being for burthen, defence, and ornament, the richest that ever spread cloth before the wind. She carried 100 brass cannon, and was 1,600 tons, a rare sailer, the work of the famous Phineas Pett."

Commissioner Pett
Pett became Commissioner of Chatham Dockyard in 1648. Despite his contracts from the King, Peter Pett sided with Parliament during the English Civil War and was consequently retained as Commissioner at Chatham Dockyard during the Commonwealth (1649–60).

Pett was the only member of the group of Commonwealth Commissioners who governed the Navy with any technical knowledge of shipbuilding, and responsibility for the designs of most new ships rested principally upon him. He became a Justice of the Peace by 1649. In 1659 he was elected Member of Parliament (MP) for Rochester in the Third Protectorate Parliament. He was re-elected MP for Rochester in 1660 for the Convention Parliament.

Determined to survive the rigours of the nation's political upheavals, Pett, with great resourcefulness, having withheld Chatham from Charles I, was afterwards in Holland preparing the fleet to accompany the return of Charles II. The success of these efforts established for Pett a firm relationship with the King.

In 1667 Pett was blamed for the insufficient protection of the British fleet at Chatham, the charge being that he failed to tow the most capital ships higher up the river. Modern historians argue that it is doubtful whether this would have protected them, the Dutch being powerful enough to advance a few miles more, and that Pett did not have enough manpower anyway. Asked during the official investigation why he had brought his ship models into safety but not the ships themselves, he answered that the former were more valuable, much to the incredulous laughter of his accusers. Pett's view was that without the models it was impossible to build new ships, as it was not then feasible to build from drawings alone. Pett was fined and dismissed. He was seen to be a scapegoat for the incompetence of higher-ranking officers, as shown in part of Andrew Marvell's satirical poem:

Pett's will was proved on 2 December 1672, and it revealed that he had enough worldly goods to be able to live in comfort after his dismissal as Commissioner. For example, in his will there was mentioned a necklace containing over 270 pearls, and that he was Lord of the Manors of Woodbridge Ufford and Kettle Ufford in Suffolk indicates that he remained possessed of some wealth.

Pett dynasty

see separate article

Some confusion may arise between the identities of Peter Pett and his many relatives; even the Navy Board had difficulty in keeping its records straight on this matter.

From probably before the time that John Pett, (son of Thomas) was paid for caulking the Regent in 1499, the Petts have been mistaken, one for the other. Often this was the case with Peter Pett. The first of that name was a Master Shipwright at Deptford in the late 16th century, who built a number of English warships and other vessels from the 1570s onwards. The next Peter Pett, two generations later, was also a Master Shipwright at Deptford, who died in 1652. That Peter had two sons, Sir Peter, the Advocate General for Ireland and Sir Phineas Pett, Master Shipwright at Chatham, who was knighted in 1680, and who was the Comptroller of Stores, and resident Commissioner at Chatham, and who is further to be distinguished from the Commissioner Peter Pett's brother Phineas, a clerk of the check at Chatham.

Three other Petts named Phineas were at the same time in the Naval Service at Chatham or in the Thames, one of whom was killed in action in 1666 whilst in command of the Tyger, this being a brother of the 2nd Commissioner at Chatham.

The Roll and index of the domestic State Papers have so confused the numerous Petts as to have been described as useless.

References

English shipwrights
Original Fellows of the Royal Society
English MPs 1659
English MPs 1660
1610 births
17th-century deaths
17th-century Royal Navy personnel